Elizabeth Debicki (born 24 August 1990) is an Australian actress. After studying drama at the Victorian College of the Arts, she made her film debut with a brief role in the Australian comedy A Few Best Men (2011). Debicki's role in Baz Luhrmann's The Great Gatsby (2013) won her the AACTA Award for Best Supporting Actress. She played Ayesha in the Marvel film Guardians of the Galaxy Vol. 2 (2017), and gained critical attention for her performance in Steve McQueen's heist thriller Widows (2018). The following year, she received the Cannes Film Festival's Trophée Chopard. She then co-starred in Christopher Nolan's science fiction thriller Tenet (2020).

On television, Debicki appeared in the Australian series Rake (2014), starred in the BBC limited series The Night Manager (2016), for which she received a Critics' Choice Television Award nomination, and the HBO television film The Tale (2018). In 2022, she portrayed Diana, Princess of Wales in the Netflix drama series The Crown, gaining a nomination for a Golden Globe Award for Best Supporting Actress.

Early life
Elizabeth Debicki (original Polish surname Dębicki: [dɛmˈbʲit͡skʲi]) was born on 24 August 1990 in Paris to a Polish father and an Australian mother of Irish descent. Her parents were both ballet dancers, who met while performing in a show together. When she was five, the family moved to Glen Waverley in Melbourne, Australia. The eldest of three children, she has a younger sister and a brother.

Debicki became interested in ballet at an early age and trained as a dancer until deciding to switch to theatre. A student at Huntingtower School in eastern Melbourne, she achieved two perfect study scores in Drama and English and was the school's dux when she graduated in 2007. In 2010, she completed a degree in drama at the Victorian College of the Arts. In August 2009, she was the recipient of a Richard Pratt Bursary for outstanding acting students in their second year of training.

Career

Career beginnings (2011–2016)

Debicki made her feature film debut in the 2011 Australian film A Few Best Men, with a brief appearance as a secretary. This was her first role after graduating from drama school. After seeing her audition reel, director Baz Luhrmann, who was casting for his upcoming film adaptation of The Great Gatsby, flew her to auditions in Los Angeles, where she screen tested with actor Tobey Maguire. In May 2011, Luhrmann announced that she had been cast as Jordan Baker in his 2013 film The Great Gatsby. She would go on to receive rave reviews for her portrayal of the character, winning an AACTA Award for Best Actress in a Supporting Role. In December 2012, Debicki was the subject of a photo shoot for Vogue Australia.

From June to July 2013, Debicki played Madame in the Sydney Theatre Company's production of Jean Genet's play The Maids, with Cate Blanchett starring as Claire and Isabelle Huppert as Solange. She won the best newcomer award at the Sydney Theatre Awards for her performance. In 2014, the play transferred off-Broadway at the New York City Center. Around this same time, Debicki also starred in a 13-minute short film called "Gödel Incomplete" and made an appearance as a guest star in the third season of the Australian television series Rake.

In 2015, Debicki played supporting roles in three major motion pictures. She played the villain in Guy Ritchie's film adaptation of The Man from U.N.C.L.E. (2015), learning to drive on set. She also appeared in Australian film director Justin Kurzel's adaptation of Macbeth, as well as the biographical adventure film Everest, which would gross $203 million worldwide. The following year, she starred as Mona Sanders alongside Mark Strong and Hope Davis in the world première stage adaptation of Georges Simenon's novel The Man on the Bench in the Barn titled, The Red Barn by David Hare at the National Theatre's Lyttelton Theatre in London. The play ran from October 2016 to January 2017.

In 2016 Debicki played major roles in two television shows. She played the lead role of Dr. Anna Macy in the eight-part Australian television series The Kettering Incident, which was shot almost entirely on location in Tasmania. A few months after shooting on that show ended, Debicki headed to Switzerland to begin shooting the television miniseries The Night Manager; she played the role of Jed in the adaptation of the John le Carré novel of the same name. The show aired in the United States in April 2016.

Breakthrough (2017–present)

Following the success of The Night Manager, Debicki landed a supporting role in the Marvel Studios film Guardians of the Galaxy Vol. 2, in which she portrayed Ayesha, leader of the Sovereign people. She will return for its sequel and the final installment in the film series, Guardians of the Galaxy Vol. 3. In June 2017, she was added to the cast of director Luc Besson's Valerian and the City of a Thousand Planets in an undisclosed voice-over role. The film would arrive in theaters around two months later, at which time her role was revealed to be that of Emperor Haban-Limaï. 2017 also saw Debicki as Eva in Australian actor Simon Baker's directorial debut Breath, for which she would receive an AACTA Award nomination for Best Actress in a Supporting Role. The film would garner five additional AACTA Award nominations, including Best Film, and would win Best Supporting Actor and Best Sound at the 8th AACTA Awards.

In 2018, Debicki appeared in five films. She played the role of Jensen in The Cloverfield Paradox, the third instalment in the Cloverfield franchise. The film was released on Netflix in February 2018, directly after Super Bowl LII. Following this, she appeared as Mrs. G in the critically acclaimed HBO film The Tale, for which she received rave reviews. One of her biggest roles yet would come several months later, however, in November 2018; she played the role of Alice in Steve McQueen's heist film Widows. Upon the film's release, she received some of the best reviews of her career, with many critics stating how impressed they were that she managed to stand out among such a crowded cast, which included the likes of Viola Davis and Liam Neeson. The same year, Debicki also starred as Virginia Woolf in Vita & Virginia and was the voice of Mopsy Rabbit in Peter Rabbit. She would return for the sequel, Peter Rabbit 2: The Runaway.

Debicki had a leading role in the 2019 thriller The Burnt Orange Heresy, in which she starred opposite Claes Bang and Mick Jagger. The following year, she starred in Christopher Nolan's spy film Tenet (2020) as Kat, the estranged wife of Kenneth Branagh's character. Peter Bradshaw of The Guardian thought that she had "the most recognisable human emotions here, shouting, crying and even smiling in a way that no one else quite does" but added that her role was similar to the one she played in The Night Manager. In an interview with Divya-Kala Bhavani of The Hindu, Debicki recalls, "Playing Kat, I understood the harrowing scenes are important to show the audience the threats to her existence — physical and psychological — she faced."

Debicki portrays Diana, Princess of Wales in the final two seasons of the Netflix period drama series The Crown, taking over from Emma Corrin. Debicki's performance in the fifth season earned her a nomination for the Golden Globe Award for Best Supporting Actress in a Television Series – Comedy/Musical or Drama and a Screen Actors Guild Award for Outstanding Performance by a Female Actor in a Drama Series.

Acting roles

Film

Television

Stage

Awards and nominations

References

External links
 
 

1990 births
Living people
21st-century Australian actresses
Actresses from Paris
Actresses from Melbourne
Australian film actresses
Australian people of Irish descent
Australian people of Polish descent
Australian stage actresses
Australian television actresses
Best Supporting Actress AACTA Award winners
Victorian College of the Arts alumni
French emigrants to Australia
People from Glen Waverley, Victoria
Chopard Trophy for Female Revelation winners